Charles Buddie Mullins is an American chemical engineer, currently the Matthew Van Winkle Regents Professor and Z. D. Bonner Professor at University of Texas at Austin.

References

Year of birth missing (living people)
Living people
American chemical engineers
University of Texas at Austin faculty